Qiongzhou or Qiong Prefecture was a zhou (prefecture) in imperial China seated in modern Qionglai City in Sichuan, China. It existed (intermittently) from the 6th century to 1913. Between 742 and 758 it was known as Linqiong Commandery.

Counties
Qiong Prefecture administered the following counties (縣) through history:

References

 
 
 

Prefectures of the Sui dynasty
Prefectures of the Tang dynasty
Chengdufu Circuit
Prefectures of Former Shu
Prefectures of Later Shu
Prefectures of Later Tang
Former prefectures in Sichuan
Prefectures of the Yuan dynasty
Subprefectures of the Ming dynasty
Departments of the Qing dynasty